Flight 3 may refer to the following aviation accidents or incidents:

See also
Flight (comics), volume 3

0003